Stiles is a town in Oconto County, Wisconsin, United States. The population was 1,465 at the 2000 census. The unincorporated communities of Stiles and Stiles Junction are located in the town. Situated within ancestral Menominee territory that was ceded to the United States in the 1836 Treaty of the Cedars, its Menominee name is Pæhkuahkiw which means "pointed hillock".

Geography
According to the United States Census Bureau, the town has a total area of 35.2 square miles (91.2 km2), of which, 34.4 square miles (89.0 km2) of it is land and 0.8 square miles (2.1 km2) of it (2.36%) is water.

Demographics
As of the census of 2000, there were 1,465 people, 578 households, and 421 families residing in the town. The population density was 42.6 people per square mile (16.5/km2). There were 620 housing units at an average density of 18.0 per square mile (7.0/km2). The racial makeup of the town was 98.23% White, 0.07% African American, 0.41% Native American, 0.07% Asian, 0.14% from other races, and 1.09% from two or more races. Hispanic or Latino of any race were 0.48% of the population.

There were 578 households, out of which 33.6% had children under the age of 18 living with them, 62.3% were married couples living together, 5.2% had a female householder with no husband present, and 27.0% were non-families. 21.5% of all households were made up of individuals, and 8.5% had someone living alone who was 65 years of age or older.  The average household size was 2.53 and the average family size was 2.95.

In the town, the population was spread out, with 26.5% under the age of 18, 5.6% from 18 to 24, 33.1% from 25 to 44, 24.2% from 45 to 64, and 10.6% who were 65 years of age or older. The median age was 39 years. For every 100 females, there were 102.9 males. For every 100 females age 18 and over, there were 104.0 males.

The median income for a household in the town was $43,882, and the median income for a family was $48,472. Males had a median income of $33,200 versus $23,320 for females. The per capita income for the town was $18,669. About 4.3% of families and 6.0% of the population were below the poverty line, including 5.4% of those under age 18 and 7.1% of those age 65 or over.

Notable people

 John Leigh, businessman and politician, lived in the town

References

External links
Town of Stiles

Towns in Oconto County, Wisconsin
Green Bay metropolitan area
Towns in Wisconsin